Pablo Juan Calvo Liste (born 17 February, 1965) is a Spanish lawyer and politician who has been a member of the Congress of Deputies since November 2019 for the Vox party.

Liste completed a degree in law at the University of Alcalá and worked as an attorney-at-law. Spanish newspaper Heraldo de Aragón noted Liste as one of fifteen Vox deputies who come from a legal background.

Ahead of the November 2019 Spanish general election, Liste was announced as Vox's number one candidate for the León constituency. He was accordingly elected as a deputy to the Congress of Deputies. In parliament, Liste sits on the  Finance and Civil Service Commission and committee for childcare.

References 

1965 births
Living people
Members of the 14th Congress of Deputies (Spain)
Vox (political party) politicians
20th-century Spanish lawyers
21st-century Spanish lawyers